Fusiturricula paulettae is a species of sea snail, a marine gastropod mollusk in the family Drilliidae.

According to Gastropods.com it is a synonym of Fusiturricula jaquensis (Sowerby, G.B. II, 1850), but it belongs to Fusiturricula according to B. Landau and C. Marques da Silva 2010

Description
The length of an adult shell attains 55 mm ; its diameter 19.9 mm.

Distribution
This marine species occurs in the Gulf of Venezuela.

References

 B. Landau and C. Marques da Silva. 2010. Early Pliocene gastropods of Cubagua, Venezuela: Taxonomy, palaeobiogeography and ecostratigraphy. Palaeontos 19:1–221

External links
 Daniel Princz (1978), Los Molluscos marinos del Golfo de Venezuela; Contribucion # 78 p. 70

paulettae
Gastropods described in 1978